Federal elections were held in Germany on 21 February 1887. The National Liberal Party became the largest party in the Reichstag by winning 98 of the 397 seats, whilst the Centre Party, formerly the largest party, was reduced to 98 seats. Voter turnout was 77.5%.

Results

Alsace-Lorraine

References

Federal elections in Germany
Germany
1887 elections in Germany
Elections in the German Empire
February 1887 events